was the first Japanese daily newspaper to be published in an evening edition.  It was established in Nagoya.

History
The name was changed to Miyako Shinbun in 1888.

In the first decade of the 20th century, the circulation of Miyako Shinbun was among the top seven in Japan.

In the 1930s, Mainichi Shimbun was in direct competitor with Miyako Shinbun.  The publication was also recognized in the foreign press.

It merged with the Kokumin Shinbun in 1942 to form the Tokyo Shimbun.

Literary serials
The journal published a number of literary serials.  In the 1890s, the newspaper had established a reputation for carrying translated or adapted versions of Western novels; but the advent of the First Sino-Japanese War became, in part, a cause for a shift in emphasis to featuring the work of Japanese writers.

One of these was Daibosatsu Toge by Nakazato Kaizan.  The work was presented to the public in 41 volumes; and it contains 1533 chapters.  This historical novel was the longest in the Japanese language until Tokugawa Ieyasu. 5.7 million Japanese characters.

See also
 Japanese newspapers
 Media of Japan

Notes

References
Miller, John Scott. (2001). Adaptations of Western literature in Meiji Japan. New York: Palgrave Macmillan. ;  OCLC 237498079
 Nishizawa, Iwata. (1917). Japan in the Taisho era. In Commemoration of the Enthronement. Tokyo: Japan Gazette. OCLC 28706155 + Internet Archive: online, full-text version
 Nussbaum, Louis Frédéric and Käthe Roth. (2005). Japan Encyclopedia. Cambridge, Massachusetts: Harvard University Press. ; OCLC 48943301

Further reading

External links
Tokyo Shimbun 

Daily newspapers published in Japan
Mass media in Nagoya